The S27 is a rush-hour railway service that connects the Swiss municipalities of Wangen and Ziegelbrücke. Despite its name, it is not formally part of the St. Gallen S-Bahn or Zürich S-Bahn networks. Südostbahn, a private company primarily owned by the federal government and several cantons, operates the service.

Operations 
The S27 is a weekday-only rush-hour service. The S27 is the only regular service for the three intermediate stops, save a few late-night and early-morning stops by the S2 and S8 of the Zürich S-Bahn.

History 
The S27 was introduced with the 15 June 2014 timetable change, replacing the S2 between Ziegelbrücke and Siebnen-Wangen. The S2 now ran express between those stops. With the December 2017 timetable change, the service level was significantly reduced: weekend trains were eliminated, and weekday service was reduced from half-hourly to rush-hour only.

References

External links 
 2023 timetable

Railway services in Switzerland
Südostbahn